The 1530s BC was a decade lasting from January 1, 1539, BC to December 31, 1530, BC.

Events and trends
 1539 BC—End of Seventeenth dynasty of Egypt, start of the Eighteenth Dynasty.
 1539 BC—Approximate first use of the Valley of the Kings.
 1534 BC—The oldest dated star chart was made in Ancient Egypt.
 1531 BC— Joseph interprets dreams of the Pharaoh, is released from prison and becomes second in Egypt next only to the Pharaoh himself.  
 1530 BC—End of the First Dynasty of Babylon and the start of the Kassite Dynasty—see History of Iraq.

Significant people

References

16th century BC